The General W.K. Wilson Jr. Bridge, more commonly known locally as the "Dolly Parton Bridge", consists of dual parallel tied through arches of weathering steel and beam viaducts of concrete that form one continuous span carrying four lanes of Interstate 65 across the Mobile-Tensaw River Delta northeast of the U.S. city of Mobile, Alabama. It was named in honor of Walter K. Wilson, a Chief of Engineers with the United States Army Corps of Engineers and long-term resident of Mobile. He was credited with being one of the first people recognizing the need to construct a high-level bridge on Interstate 65 over the Mobile River that would not impede waterway development. The state of Alabama named the bridge in his honor after completion of construction in 1978.

Dolly Parton Bridge
The bridge has red warning lights atop the parallel support arches which, when combined with the shape of the supporting arches when approached from certain directions, have caused the bridge to gain the nickname "Dolly Parton Bridge".

May 22, 2014 fire
On May 22, 2014 the bridge suffered damage in the northbound portion due to extreme heat caused following an accident involving two semi-trailer trucks. One truck carrying petroleum barrels, stopped due to a previous accident, was rear ended by another truck, with an explosion ensuing. The driver of the tractor which impacted the trailer was killed. The subsequent fire and extreme heat generated caused significant damage to the concrete deck. The bridge was temporarily closed for two days and then reopened to one lane of northbound traffic. The Alabama Department of Transportation estimated it would take several months to replace the top 8 inches of the concrete deck over an unspecified area of the damaged bridge. The two northbound lanes were completely closed during construction, with the two southbound lanes divided into one southbound and one northbound lane.

See also

References

Transportation buildings and structures in Baldwin County, Alabama
Bridges in Mobile County, Alabama
Bridges completed in 1978
Bridges over the Mobile River
Concrete bridges in the United States
Tied arch bridges in the United States
Road bridges in Alabama
Interstate 65
Bridges on the Interstate Highway System
Weathering steel
Through arch bridges in the United States